Värmdö IF is a Swedish football club located in Värmdö Municipality in Stockholm County.

Background
Since their foundation in 1948 Värmdö IF has participated mainly in the lower divisions of the Swedish football league system.  The club currently plays in Division 2 Södra Svealand which is the fourth tier of Swedish football. They play their home matches at the Värmdövallen in Värmdö.

The U-19 team is 2013 playing in the first division in Stockholms Fotbollförbund U-19.

The club is affiliated to the Stockholms Fotbollförbund.

Season to season

External links
 Värmdö IF – Official Website

Footnotes

Football clubs in Stockholm
Association football clubs established in 1948
1948 establishments in Sweden